Melissa Milagros “Mel” Díaz Caballero (born 26 October 1983) is a Peruvian footballer who plays as a midfielder. She has been a member of the Peru women's national team.

International career
Díaz played for Peru at senior level in two Copa América Femenina editions (2003 and 2014).

References

External links
Melissa Díaz at BDFútbol

Melissa Díaz at Txapeldunak.com 

1983 births
Living people
Footballers from Lima
Peruvian women's footballers
Women's association football midfielders
Club Universitario de Deportes footballers
Segunda Federación (women) players
Peru women's international footballers
Peruvian expatriate footballers
Peruvian expatriate sportspeople in Spain
Expatriate women's footballers in Spain